Collins Tetteh Nartey, known professionally as DJ Aroma, is a Ghanaian disc jockey. He is the official DJ for the annual Detty Rave music festival in Ghana. He was listed among the top ten DJs in Africa in 2019. He was awarded the DJ of the Year at the 2021 3Music Awards and the Radio DJ of the Year at the 2020 RTP awards.

Career 
DJ Aroma started his career as he was in Kwame Nkrumah University of Science And Technology of which he made his playlist through VLC. He later moved to using VirtualDJ for his song mixes.

He currently works with Pure FM (Ghana) in Kumasi now as a host and a DJ for the afterdrive show after leaving Yfm (102.5). He was one of the DJ's to feature in Mr Eazi Detty Rave 2 Concert 2018.

Awards and nominations 
DJ Aroma won the Best Pub DJ of the Year in the 2018 edition of the Ghana DJ Awards.

Notable Performances 

 Ghana Meets Naija 2019
 DJ Awards Pub Fest
 Detty Rave 2
 Road to Detty Rave

Discography

Singles

2020 

 God Flow feat. Sarkodie, Medikal, Teephlow, RJZ & $pacely

References 

Living people
Year of birth missing (living people)
Ghanaian DJs
Kwame Nkrumah University of Science and Technology alumni